Hakeem Tyrone Dawodu (born July 2, 1991) is a Canadian mixed martial artist, currently signed to Ultimate Fighting Championship and fights in the Featherweight division. He previously competed for the World Series of Fighting.

Early life
Dawodu was born in Calgary to a mother from Nigeria and a father from Jamaica. When he was six years old, his father was deported, forcing his mother to raise him on her own. He had a troubled childhood; he was first placed in a juvenile detention center at the age of 14. Two years later, his counselor placed him in Muay Thai training as a means of controlling his anger.

Mixed martial arts career
His background is in Muay Thai, where he went 42–5 (15 KOs) as an amateur and 9–0 (7 KOs) as a pro.

World Series of Fighting
On February 21, 2014, Dawodu made his professional debut at WSOF Canada 1 against Behrang Yousefi. He won the fight via knockout in the first round.

On June 7, 2014, Dawodu faced Jake Macdonald at WSOF Canada 2. He won the fighting via knockout in the second round.

On October 11, 2014, Dawodu faced Mike Malott at WSOF 14. He won via technical knockout due to punches and elbows in the first round.

On February 11, 2015, Dawodu faced Tristan Johnson at WSOF 18. He won via technical knockout in the third round.

On June 5, 2015, Dawodu faced Chuka Willis at WSOF 21. He won via technical knockout due to knees and punches in the second round.

On December 18, 2015, Dawodu faced Marat Magomedov at WSOF 26. The fight ended in a majority draw.

On July 30, 2016, Dawodu faced Marat Magomedov at WSOF 32 in a rematch. He won the fight via technical knockout in the second round.

On March 18, 2017, Dawodu faced UFC vet Steven Siler at WSOF 35. He won the fight via unanimous decision, this marked the first time he gained victory by decision.

Ultimate Fighting Championship
On November 11, 2017, it was announced that Dawodu signed a four fight deal with the UFC.

Dawodu faced Danny Henry on March 17, 2018 at UFC Fight Night 127. He lost the fight via submission in the fight's opening minute.

Dawodu faced Austin Arnett on July 28, 2018 at UFC on Fox 30. He won the fight via unanimous decision.

Dawodu faced Kyle Bochniak on December 8, 2018 at UFC 231. Dawodu won the fight via split decision.

Dawodu faced promotional newcomer Yoshinori Horie on July 27, 2019 at UFC 240 He won the fight via knockout in round three. This win earned him the Performance of the Night award.

Dawodu faced Julio Arce on November 2, 2019 at UFC 244. He won the fight by split decision.

Dawodu faced Zubaira Tukhugov on September 27, 2020 at UFC 253. Tukhugov missed weight, and was subsequently fined a percentage of his purse, which will go to Dawodu. Dawodu won by split decision.

Dawodu was expected to face Shane Burgos on January 24, 2021 at UFC 257. However, Dawodu was forced to withdraw from the bout, citing shoulder injury.'

Dawodu faced Movsar Evloev on June 12, 2021 at UFC 263. He lost the fight via unanimous decision.

Dawodu faced Michael Trizano on February 5, 2022 at UFC Fight Night 200. He won the fight via unanimous decision.

Dawodu faced Julian Erosa on September 10, 2022 at UFC 279. At the weigh-ins, Dawodu weighed in at 149.5 pounds, 3.5 pounds over the non-title featherweight limit. Dawodu was fined 30% of his purse, which will go to his opponent Erosa. Dawodu lost the fight via unanimous decision.

Championships and accomplishments
MMA
Ultimate Fighting Championship
Performance of the Night (One time) 
Muay Thai & Kickboxing
Professional
World Muaythai Council
Intercontinental Welterweight Champion (2014)
Amateur
International Federation of Muaythai Amateur
2012 IFMA World Cup A-class Tournament  (-63,5 kg)
2011 IFMA European Cup A-Class  (-63,5 kg)
2010 IFMA World Championship B-class  (-63,5 kg)
Pan American Muaythai Union
Super lightweight Champion (2012)
International Kickboxing Federation
Full Muay Thai Rules Light Welterweight World Champion (2011)
2010 IKF World Classic Muay Thai Rules Welterweight Champion

Mixed martial arts record

|-
|Loss
|align=center|13–3–1
|Julian Erosa
|Decision (unanimous)
|UFC 279
|
|align=center|3
|align=center|5:00
|Las Vegas, Nevada, United States
|
|-
|Win
|align=center|13–2–1
|Michael Trizano
|Decision (unanimous)
|UFC Fight Night: Hermansson vs. Strickland
| 
|align=center|3
|align=center|5:00
|Las Vegas, Nevada, United States
|
|-
|Loss
|align=center|12–2–1
|Movsar Evloev
|Decision (unanimous) 
|UFC 263 
|
|align=center|3
|align=center|5:00
|Glendale, Arizona, United States
|
|-
|Win
|align=center|12–1–1
|Zubaira Tukhugov
|Decision (split)
|UFC 253 
|
|align=center|3
|align=center|5:00
|Abu Dhabi, United Arab Emirates
|
|-
|Win
|align=center|11–1–1
|Julio Arce
|Decision (split)
| 
|
|align=center|3
|align=center|5:00
|New York City, New York, United States
|
|-
|Win
|align=center|
|Yoshinori Horie
|TKO (head kick)
|UFC 240 
|
|align=center|3
|align=center|4:09
|Edmonton, Alberta, Canada
|
|-
|Win
|align=center|9–1–1
|Kyle Bochniak
|Decision (split)
|UFC 231 
|
|align=center|3
|align=center|5:00
|Toronto, Ontario, Canada
|
|-
|Win
|align=center|8–1–1
|Austin Arnett
|Decision (unanimous)
|UFC on Fox: Alvarez vs. Poirier 2 
|
|align=center|3
|align=center|5:00
|Calgary, Alberta, Canada
|
|-
|Loss
|align=center|7–1–1
|Danny Henry
|Technical Submission (guillotine choke)
|UFC Fight Night: Werdum vs. Volkov 
|
|align=center|1
|align=center|0:39
|London, England
|
|-
|Win
|align=center|7–0–1
|Steven Siler
|Decision (unanimous)
|WSOF 35
|
|align=center|3
|align=center|5:00
|Verona, New York, United States
|
|-
|Win
|align=center|6–0–1
|Marat Magomedov
|TKO (punches)
|WSOF 32
|
|align=center|2
|align=center|2:03
|Everett, Washington, United States
|
|-
|Draw
|align=center|5–0–1
|Marat Magomedov
|Draw (majority)
|WSOF 26
|
|align=center|3
|align=center|5:00
|Las Vegas, Nevada, United States
|
|-
|Win
|align=center|5–0
|Chuka Willis
|TKO (knees and elbows)
|WSOF 21
|
|align=center|2
|align=center|2:55
|Edmonton, Alberta, Canada
|
|-
|Win
|align=center|4–0
|Tristan Johnson
|TKO (punches)
|WSOF 18
|
|align=center|3
|align=center|1:59
|Edmonton, Alberta, Canada
|
|-
|Win
|align=center|3–0
|Mike Malott
|TKO (punches and elbows)
|WSOF 14
|
|align=center|1
|align=center|4:13
|Edmonton, Alberta, Canada
|
|-
|Win
|align=center|2–0
|Jake Macdonald
|KO (punches)
|WSOF Canada 2
|
|align=center|2
|align=center|0:18
|Edmonton, Alberta, Canada
|
|-
|Win
|align=center|1–0
|Behrang Yousefi
|KO (punch)
|WSOF Canada 1
|
|align=center|1
|align=center|1:07
|Edmonton, Alberta, Canada
|

Muay Thai and Kickboxing record

|-  style="text-align:center; background:#cfc;"
| 2015-01-24|| Win||align=left| Charlie Peters || Canadian Challenger Muay Thai Series 12 || Edmonton, Canada || Decision (Unanimous) || 5 || 3:00
|-  style="text-align:center; background:#cfc;"
| 2014-04-05|| Win||align=left| Samsamut Kiatponthip || Canadian Challenger Muay Thai Series 10 || Calgary, Canada || Decision (Unanimous) || 5 || 3:00 
|-
! style=background:white colspan=9 |
|-  style="text-align:center; background:#cfc;"
| 2014-01-24|| Win||align=left| Junpei Hirai || WMC Challenger Muay Thai Series 9 || Calgary, Canada || KO || 1 ||
|-  style="text-align:center; background:#cfc;"
| 2013-11-17|| Win||align=left| Kongnapa Weerasakreck || M-FIGHT SUK WEERASAKRECK IV || Tokyo, Japan || TKO (Punches)|| 3 || 2:36
|-  style="text-align:center; background:#cfc;"
| 2013-05-25|| Win||align=left| Ryan Wiese || K-1 8-man tournament, final  || Port of Spain, Trinidad and Tobago || Decision (Unanimous) || 3 || 3:00
|-  style="text-align:center; background:#cfc;"
| 2013-05-25|| Win||align=left|  || K-1 8-man tournament, semi-finals  || Port of Spain, Trinidad and Tobago || KO || 3 ||
|-  style="text-align:center; background:#cfc;"
| 2013-05-25|| Win||align=left| Davin Sinaswee || K-1 8-man tournament, quarter-finals  || Port of Spain, Trinidad and Tobago || KO (Low Kick) || 1 ||
|-  style="text-align:center; background:#cfc;"
| 2013-04-19|| Win||align=left| Sheldon Gaines || Challenger 7 - 'HEAVY DUTY'  || Calgary, Canada || KO || 4 ||
|-  style="text-align:center; background:#cfc;"
| 2012-11-24|| Win||align=left| Rungjaras || Muay Thai Mayhem 3 || Edmonton, Canada || KO (Left Hook) || 2 ||
|-
| colspan=9 | Legend:    

|-  style="background:#cfc;"
| 2012-10-19|| Win||align=left| Omar Estevez || FATE 4 Man Tournament Final Title Bout || Calgary, Canada || Decision (Unanimous)  || 5 || 2:00
|-  style="background:#cfc;"
| 2012-10-19|| Win||align=left| Wayne Fisher|| FATE 4 Man Tournament Semi Final Bout || Calgary, Canada || Decision (Unanimous)  || 3 || 2:00
|-  style="background:#cfc;"
| 2012-09-13|| Win||align=left| Dmitry Varats || IFMA World Championship 2012, -63.5 kg Bronze Medal fight || Saint Petersburg, Russia || Decision  || 3 || 3:00 
|-
! style=background:white colspan=9 |
|-  style="background:#fbb;"
| 2012-09-11|| Loss ||align=left| Igor Liubchenko || IFMA World Championships 2012, -63.5 kg Semi Final || Saint Petersburg, Russia || Decision (Split)  || 3 || 3:00
|-  style="background:#cfc;"
| 2012-09-10|| Win||align=left| Awad Jawid || IFMA World Championships 2012, -63.5 kg Quarter Final || Saint Petersburg, Russia || Decision   || 3 || 3:00
|-  style="background:#cfc;"
| 2012-09-08|| Win||align=left| Cezary Zugaj || IFMA World Championships 2012, -63.5 kg First Round || Saint Petersburg, Russia || KO || 3 ||
|-  style="background:#cfc;"
| 2012-03-10|| Win||align=left| Sebastian Calvo ||  Challenger MuayThai Series Challenger 6 || Calgary, Canada || Decision (Unanimous)|| 5 || 2:00 
|-
! style=background:white colspan=9 |
|-  style="background:#cfc;"
| 2012-01-28|| Win||align=left| Parnpetch Petch Taling Ngarm || Challenger 3 – JAWBREAKER || Calgary, Canada || Decision (Split)|| 5 || 2:00
|-  style="background:#cfc;"
| 2011-12-03|| Win||align=left| Alex Tribe || K-1 last man standing 8-man tournament, final || Victoria, British Columbia, Canada || TKO || 2 ||
|-  style="background:#cfc;"
| 2011-12-03|| Win||align=left| Josh Jauncey || K-1 last man standing 8-man tournament, semi-final || Victoria, British Columbia, Canada || Decision (Majority) || 3 || 2:00
|-  style="background:#cfc;"
| 2011-12-03|| Win||align=left| Josh Wright || K-1 last man standing 8-man tournament, quarter-final || Victoria, British Columbia, Canada || TKO || 1 ||
|-  style="background:#cfc;"
| 2011-11-25|| Win||align=left| Feng Jie ||  || Vancouver, Canada || Decision || 3 || 2:00
|-  style="background:#cfc;"
| 2011-09-17|| Win||align=left| Tanuthong || Challenger 2 – EXPLOSION || Calgary, Canada || Decision || 5 || 2:00
|-  style="background:#cfc;"
| 2011-04-23|| Win ||align=left| Ryo Takagi || "CHALLENGER 1 -CONCUSSION" || Calgary, Canada || TKO (Knee) || 2 || 
|-
! style=background:white colspan=9 |
|-  style="background:#fbb;"
| 2011-03-12|| Loss ||align=left| Aganes Safaryan || IFMA European Cup, -63.5 kg Final || Dresden, Germany || Decision (Split) || 3 || 
|-
! style=background:white colspan=9 |
|-  style="background:#cfc;"
| 2011-03-12|| Win||align=left| Steffen Weise || IFMA European Cup, -63.5 kg Semi Final || Dresden, Germany || Decision || 3 ||
|-  style="background:#cfc;"
| 2011-03-11|| Win||align=left| Yevgen Trofymov || IFMA European Cup, -63.5 kg Quarter Final || Dresden, Germany || Decision || 3 ||
|-  style="background:#cfc;"
| 2011-02-04|| Win ||align=left| Karl Pearson || Ringmasters || Calgary, Canada || TKO (Corner Stoppage) || 3 ||
|-  style="background:#cfc;"
| 2010-12-04|| Win||align=left| Soufiane Taaouati || IFMA World Championship 2010, final  || Bangkok, Thailand || Decision (Unanimous) || 3 || 3:00 
|-
! style=background:white colspan=9 |
|-  style="background:#cfc;"
| 2010-12-03|| Win||align=left| Ramil Novruzov  || IFMA World Championship 2010, semi-final  || Bangkok, Thailand || Decision (Unanimous) || 3 || 3:00
|-  style="background:#cfc;"
| 2010-12-01|| Win||align=left| Kaplan Abukov  || IFMA World Championship 2010, quarter-final  || Bangkok, Thailand || Decision (Unanimous) || 3 || 3:00
|-  style="background:#cfc;"
| 2010-11-30|| Win||align=left| Willie Rewi  || IFMA World Championship 2010, second round  || Bangkok, Thailand || Decision (Unanimous) || 3 || 3:00
|-  style="background:#cfc;"
| 2010-11-28|| Win||align=left| Zhang Dezheng || IFMA World Championship 2010, first round  || Bangkok, Thailand || Decision (Unanimous) || 3 || 3:00
|-  style="background:#cfc;"
| 2010-07-24|| Win ||align=left| Corey Springer || 2010 IKF World Classic, final || Orlando, Florida, United States || TKO  || 2 || 1:58 
|-
! style=background:white colspan=9 |
|-  style="background:#cfc;"
| 2010-07-24|| Win ||align=left| Joshua Hill || 2010 IKF World Classic, semi-final || Orlando, Florida, United States || TKO  || 2 || 1:24
|-  style="background:#cfc;"
| 2010-07-23|| Win ||align=left| Trevor Morgan || 2010 IKF World Classic, quarter-final || Orlando, Florida, United States || Decision (Unanimous)  || 2 || 2:00
|-  style="background:#cfc;"
| 2010-07-23|| Win ||align=left| Lance Garza || 2010 IKF World Classic, preliminary round || Orlando, Florida, United States || TKO  || 1 || 1:03 
|-
| colspan=9 | Legend:

See also
 List of current UFC fighters
 List of Canadian UFC fighters
 List of male mixed martial artists

References

External links
 
 

1991 births
Living people
Canadian male mixed martial artists
Canadian kickboxers
Canadian Muay Thai practitioners
Featherweight mixed martial artists
Mixed martial artists utilizing Muay Thai
Sportspeople from Calgary
Canadian sportspeople of Jamaican descent
Canadian sportspeople of Nigerian descent
Ultimate Fighting Championship male fighters
Black Canadian mixed martial artists